London Suite may refer to:
 London Suite (play), the stage play by Neil Simon that premiered in 1994
 London Suite (film), a 1996 television film based on the play
 London Suite (Coates), the 1933 orchestral suite by Eric Coates